Half Way to Heaven is a 1929 American Pre-Code drama film directed by George Abbott and written by Abbott, Henry Leyford Gates, and Gerald Geraghty. The film stars Charles "Buddy" Rogers, Jean Arthur, Paul Lukas, Helen Ware, Oscar Apfel and Irving Bacon. The film was released on December 14, 1929, by Paramount Pictures. As was common during the early years of sound before dubbing became more established, several multiple-language versions were produced at the Joinville Studios in Paris including a Swedish-language version Half Way to Heaven.

Cast
Charles "Buddy" Rogers as Ned Lee
Jean Arthur as Greta Nelson
Paul Lukas	as Nick Pogli
Helen Ware as Madame Elsie
Oscar Apfel as Circus Manager
Irving Bacon as Slim
Al Hill as Blackie
Guy Oliver as Farmer at Railroad Station

References

External links
 

1929 films
1920s English-language films
American drama films
1929 drama films
Paramount Pictures films
Films directed by George Abbott
American black-and-white films
1920s American films